Genoa–Nice was a professional cycle race held as a single-day race between Genoa, Italy and Nice, France. It was first held in 1910 and held for the final time in 1975. In 1961 and 1962 it was part of the Super Prestige Pernod series. In 1958, 1960, 1962, 1964, 1967 and 1973 it was held in the opposite direction, from Nice to Genoa.

Winners

References

Men's road bicycle races
Cycle races in France
Cycle races in Italy
Super Prestige Pernod races
Recurring sporting events established in 1910
Recurring sporting events disestablished in 1975
Defunct cycling races in France
1910 establishments in France
1975 disestablishments in France
Defunct cycling races in Italy
1910 establishments in Italy
1975 disestablishments in Italy